Trus or variation, may refer to:

 Transrectal ultrasonography (TRUS)
 Vitali Trus (born 1988), Belarusian ice hockey player
 Viktar Trus, a Belarusian discus thrower at the 2019 Summer Universiade and 2017 European Athletics U23 Championships

See also

 
 Truss (disambiguation)
 Tru (disambiguation)